Peter John Bell Clarricoats CBE, FREng, FRS (6 April 1932 – 17 January 2020) was a British engineer, and was professor of electronic engineering at Queen Mary, University of London from 1968 to 1997. Clarricoats had begun his academic career in 1959 as a lecturer at Queen’s University Belfast, followed by a move in 1961 to the University of Sheffield. He was appointed as a professor at the University of Leeds in 1963, which made him the youngest professor in his field at the time.
He received his PhD from the University of London in 1958, with a thesis entitled "Properties of waveguides containing ferrites with special reference to waveguides of circular cross-section".

He was vice-president of the Institution of Electrical Engineers, from 1989 to 1991.
He was vice-president and treasurer of URSI (the International Union of Radio Science) from 1993 to 1999.
He was appointed a Fellow at the Royal Academy of Engineering in 1983. From 1995 to 1997 he was a director of Filtronic plc, and in 1998 became chair of the Technology Advisory board of Filtronic. 
He was educated at Minchenden Grammar School and Imperial College London.

In September 2015 Clarricoats was awarded the Sir Frank Whittle medal of the Royal Academy of Engineering, one of the academy's highest accolades.

Works
Microwave Ferrites, Wiley, 1961

 Microwave Horns and Feeds (1994)

References

1932 births
2020 deaths
British electronics engineers
Commanders of the Order of the British Empire
Fellows of the Royal Society
Fellows of the Royal Academy of Engineering
Alumni of Imperial College London
People from Southgate, London